Sikanderpur is a metro station on the Yellow Line of the Delhi Metro and since November 2013, acts as an interchange station for Rapid Metro. This interchange station sees a large crowd (300,000-500,000 daily) going to office and important places along this line. It benefits commuters who previously reached these places by auto or bus.

See also
List of Delhi Metro stations
Transport in Delhi

References

External links

 Delhi Metro Rail Corporation Ltd. (Official site) 
 Delhi Metro Annual Reports
 

Delhi Metro stations
Railway stations opened in 2010
Railway stations in Gurgaon district
2010 establishments in Delhi
Rapid Metro Gurgaon stations